Guerra Revolucionaria (2011) (Spanish for "Revolutionary War") was a major professional wrestling event produced by Mexican professional wrestling promotion International Wrestling Revolution Group (IWRG), which took place on April 17, 2011 in Arena Naucalpan, Naucalpan, State of Mexico, Mexico. The main event of the show was a 20-man Battle Royal where the eliminated wrestlers would all remain at ringside and act as "Lumberjacks" to ensure none of the participants left the ring. Each lumberjack would be given a leather straps they were allowed to use on the still-active competitors. There was no official prize for winning the match other than the increased public profile of the winning wrestler.

Production

Background
Beginning in 2009 the Mexican wrestling promotion International Wrestling Revolution Group (IWRG; Sometimes referred to as Grupo Internacional Revolución in Spanish) held an annual show called Guerra Revolucionaria ("The Revolutionary War"), a reference to the Mexican revolutionary war (1810-1821). The main event match, the eponymous Guerra Revolucionaria, a 20-man Battle Royal where all 20 wrestlers start out in the ring. Once a wrestler is thrown over the top rope to the floor that wrestler is eliminated from the actual match and instead will act as a "Lumberjack" outside the ring, ensuring that none of remaining competitors try to escape the ring. Each "lumberjack" is given a leather strap that they are allowed to use on anyone that leaves the ring. The multi-man match often allows IWRG to intersect various ongoing storylines as another step in the escalating tension. At other times the match itself was used as a way to start new feuds due to interactions inside or outside the ring. The Guerra Revolucionaria shows, as well as the majority of the IWRG shows in general, are held in "Arena Naucalpan", owned by the promoters of IWRG and their main arena. The 2011 Guerra Revolucionaria show was the third year in a row that IWRG held a show under that name.

Storylines
The event featured five professional wrestling matches with different wrestlers, where some were involved in pre-existing scripted feuds or storylines and others simply put together by the matchmakers without a backstory. Being a professional wrestling event matches are not won legitimately through athletic competition; they are instead won via predetermined outcomes to the matches that is kept secret from the general public. Wrestlers portray either heels (the bad guys, referred to as Rudos in Mexico) or faces (fan favorites or Técnicos in Mexico).

Results

Guerra revolucionaria order of elimination

References

External links 
 

2011 in professional wrestling
2011 in Mexico
2011
April 2011 events in Mexico